Thimbleweed is the common name of any of several plants with seed heads resembling a thimble.

Species called thimbleweed include:
Rudbeckia laciniata
Anemone cylindrica
Anemone hupehensis
Anemone nemorosa
Anemone virginiana

Thimbleweed may also refer to:
Thimbleweed Park, a 2017 video game by Ron Gilbert and Gary Winnick.